Just a Woman can refer to:

Just a Woman (album), a 1985 album by Loretta Lynn
"Just a Woman" (song), a 1985 song from the album of the same name
Just a Woman (1918 film), a 1918 film
Just a Woman (1925 film), a 1925 film